The International Society for Infectious Diseases in Obstetrics and Gynaecology (ISIDOG) was established in 2013 in London, at the 9th European meeting (ESIDOG) and on October 28, 2016, at the 1st ISIDOG European Congress in Riga, the new Society ISIDOG was officially founded.

ISIDOG cooperates with EBCOG (European Board & College of Obstetrics and Gynecology) and with IUSTI (The International Union against Sexually Transmitted Infections).

Founding reasons and principles
 The need for an active, transparent and dynamic society for clinicians and scientists interested in infectious diseases in Obstetrics and Gynaecology in Europe and abroad.
 The persistent tendency to privatize ESIDOG became irresolvable, necessitating to modulate the Society into a new version that allowed to keep an open bookkeeping, regularly updated membership, list elections for board members and continuation of Friendship. In order not to offend the original ESIDOG board members who want to hold on to the old system, we respect the acronym ESIDOG to exist alongside.
 The feeling that a European Society should keep the doors open for other communities, and accept members from regions such as Eastern European and Oeral, United States but also Asian, African, Oceania and America's. Hence the Acronym was changed to 'International' instead of 'European' Society, as was decided in London on October 23, 2013.

Founding members
Gilbert Donders (Belgium)
Peter Greenhouse (UK)
Dace Rezeberga (Latvia)
Mireille Merckx (Belgium)
Begonia Martinez deTejada (Switzerland)
Istvan Sziller (Hungary)
Ljubomir Petricevic (Austria)
Pedro Vieira Baptista (Portugal)
Philippe Judlin (France)
Albert Adriaanse (The Netherlands)

Godfather: Werner Mendling (Germany)

Congresses and meetings
 1st ISIDOG conference/9th ESIDOG conference  (Riga, Latvia 28–30 October 2015)
 Course of Microscopy and Diagnosis of Vulvo-Vaginitis (Tienen, Belgium 19–20 February 2016)
 Session "Modern view of infections in O&G" at the 24th European Congress of Obstetrics and Gynecology (Torino, Italy 19–21 May 2016)

References

Epidemiology organizations
Obstetrics and gynaecology organizations
2013 establishments in England